Edward Ullendorff  (25 January 1920 – 6 March 2011) was a British scholar and historian. He was a prominent figure in Ethiopian Studies and also contributed work on the Semitic languages.

Biography
Born on 25 January 1920 in Zurich, Switzerland, Ullendorff was educated at the Graues Kloster in Berlin, the Hebrew University in Jerusalem, and the University of Oxford.

Ullendorff was first lecturer, and then Reader, in Semitic Languages at the University of St Andrews (1950–1959), Professor of Semitic Languages at the University of Manchester (1959–1964). From 1964 to 1979, he was Professor of Ethiopic at School of Oriental and African Studies (SOAS), and then Professor of Semitic Studies from 1979 to 1982. Prior to his death in 2011, Ullendorff was Professor Emeritus at the School of Oriental and African Studies in London.

In 1971, Ullendorff served as president of the Society for Old Testament Study.

Ullendorff married Dina Noack in 1943. She provided lifelong support for his academic research and translated Melanie Oppenhejm's Theresienstadt under her own name. Dina Ullendorff died in 2019.

Edward Ullendorff died on 6 March 2011.

Ark of the Covenant 
According to local legend, the original Ark of the Covenant is supposedly held in the Church of Our Lady Mary of Zion in Axum, Ethiopia. In a 1992 interview, Ullendorff said that he personally examined the ark held within the church in Axum in 1941 while a British army officer. Describing the ark there, he described it as a "Middle- to late-medieval construction, when these were fabricated ad hoc."

Honours
The British Academy has established the "Edward Ullendorf Medal", so that beginning in 2012 it is "awarded annually for scholarly distinction and achievements in the field of Semitic Languages and Ethiopian Studies."

Selected works
Exploration and Study of Abyssinia. A Brief Survey (1945)
The Semitic Languages of Ethiopia. A Comparative Phonology (1955)
Hebraic-Jewish Elements in Abyssinian (Monophysite) Christianity (1956)
An Amharic Chrestomathy (1965)
The Challenge of Amharic (1965) An inaugural lecture delivered on 28 October 1964
The Ethiopians: An Introduction to Country and People (1966)
Ethiopia and the Bible (1968) Schweich Lectures of The British Academy (1967)
Is Biblical Hebrew a Language? Bulletin of the School of Oriental and African Studies 34.2:241-255 (1971)
Some Early Amharic letters. Bulletin of the School of Oriental and African Studies 35.2:229-270. (1972)
Autobiography of Emperor Haile Selassie of Ethiopia (1978), translator
The Amharic Letters of Emperor Theodore of Ethiopia to Queen Victoria and Her Special Envoy (1979), with David L. Appleyard, Girma-Selassie Asfaw
The Hebrew Letters of Prester John (1982), with C. F. Beckingham.
A Tigrinya Chrestomathy (1985)
The Two Zions : Reminiscences of Jerusalem and Ethiopia (1989)
From the Bible to Enrico Cerulli A Miscellany of Ethiopian and Semitic Papers (1990)
From Emperor Haile Selassie to H. J. Polotsky Collected Papers IV: An Ethiopian and Semitic Miscellany (1995)

References

Footnotes

Bibliography
 Who's Who 2007
 Simon Hopkins, "Bibliography of the Writings of Professor Edward Ullendorff", in: Journal of Semitic Studies XXXIV/2 (1989), pp. 253–289.
 Dina Ullendorff, "Bibliography of the Writings of Professor Edward Ullendorff (1988-99)", in: Journal of Semitic Studies XLV/1 (2000), pp. 131–136.
 Northeast African Studies. Vol. 12, No. 1, 2012, pp. 309–310. Image of Ullendorf.

1920 births
2011 deaths
Academics of SOAS University of London
Academics of the University of Manchester
Academics of the University of Oxford
Academics of the University of St Andrews
British Jews
British orientalists
Ethiopianists
Fellows of the British Academy
Semiticists
Swiss expatriates in Germany
Expatriates in Mandatory Palestine
Swiss emigrants to the United Kingdom
Alumni of Wolfson College, Oxford
Presidents of the Society for Old Testament Study